Dance Collection is a remix album by Taiwanese singer Jolin Tsai. It was released on April 2, 2002, by Universal and D Sound. It contains remixes of her 12 songs previously released by Universal.

Background and release 
In March 1999, Tsai signed a recording contract with Universal, through which she later released four studio albums—1019 (1999), Don't Stop (2000), Show Your Love (2000), and Lucky Number (2001), the four albums have sold more than 450,000, 500,000, 280,000, and 150,000 copies in Taiwan, respectively. On November 6, 2001, Universal released for Tsai the greatest hits album, Together.

On April 2, 2002, Universal released for Tsai a remix album titled Dance Collection. It has both standard and limited editions, and the latter has two colors' versions with a limited number of 10,000 copies each. Meanwhile, Universal released the single "Show Your Love / Fall in Love with a Street / You Gotta Know" for the album.

Critical reception 
Tencent Entertainment's Shuwa commented: "This album just contains remixes of some of Jolin Tsai's well-known old works released during the Universal period. The album was just a buffer to satisfy fans' expectation of Jolin Tsai who didn't release new song for two years due to the contractual dispute at that time. Unfortunately, the popularity of her dance songs released during the Universal period is not as high as those released during the Sony and EMI periods, and the number of dance songs released during Universal period is not that much. Therefore, in this album, in addition to some dance songs, we can also hear remixes of ballads which were hard re-arranged into dance music."

Track listing

Release history

References

External links 
 

2002 remix albums
Jolin Tsai remix albums
Universal Music Taiwan remix albums